Western Europe is the western region of Europe. The region's extent varies depending on context. 

The concept of "the West" appeared in Europe in juxtaposition to "the East" and originally applied to the ancient Mediterranean world,  the Roman Empire (Western Roman Empire and Eastern Roman Empire), and medieval "Christendom" (Western Christianity and Eastern Christianity). Beginning with the Renaissance and the Age of Discovery, roughly from the 15th century, the concept of Europe as "the West" slowly became distinguished from and eventually replaced the dominant use of "Christendom" as the preferred endonym within the region. By the Age of Enlightenment and the Industrial Revolution, the concepts of "Eastern Europe" and "Western Europe" were more regularly used.

Historical divisions

Classical antiquity and medieval origins

Prior to the Roman conquest, a large part of Western Europe had adopted the newly developed La Tène culture. As the Roman domain expanded, a cultural and linguistic division appeared between the mainly Greek-speaking eastern provinces, which had formed the highly urbanized Hellenistic civilization, and the western territories, which in contrast largely adopted the Latin language. This cultural and linguistic division was eventually reinforced by the later political east–west division of the Roman Empire. The Western Roman Empire and the Eastern Roman Empire controlled the two divergent regions between the 3rd and the 5th centuries.

The division between these two was enhanced during Late antiquity and the Middle Ages by a number of events. The Western Roman Empire collapsed, starting the Early Middle Ages. By contrast, the Eastern Roman Empire, mostly known as the Greek or Byzantine Empire, survived and even thrived for another 1000 years. The rise of the Carolingian Empire in the west, and in particular the Great Schism between Eastern Orthodoxy and Roman Catholicism, enhanced the cultural and religious distinctiveness between Eastern and Western Europe.

After the conquest of the Byzantine Empire, center of the Eastern Orthodox Church, by the Muslim Ottoman Empire in the 15th century, and the gradual fragmentation of the Holy Roman Empire (which had replaced the Carolingian Empire), the division between Roman Catholic and Protestant became more important in Europe than that with Eastern Orthodoxy.

The term Far West became synonymous with Western Europe in China during the Ming dynasty. The Italian Jesuit priest Matteo Ricci was one of the first writers in China to use the Far West as an Asian counterpart to the European concept of the Far East. In Ricci's writings, Ricci referred to himself as "Matteo of the Far West". The term was still in use in the late 19th and early 20th centuries.

Religion
Christianity is the largest religion in Western Europe. According to a 2018 study by the Pew Research Center, 71.0% of Western Europeans identified as Christians.

In 1054, the East–West Schism divided Christianity into Western Christianity and Eastern Christianity. This split Europe in two, with Western Europe primarily under the Catholic Church, and Eastern Europe under the Eastern Orthodox Church. Ever since the Reformation in the 16th century, the primary Christian denominations in Western Europe have been Catholicism and Protestantism.

Under this definition of Eastern and Western Europe, Eastern Europe contains Southeastern European countries as well, while Western Europe includes Northern and Central European countries.

Cold War

During the four decades of the Cold War, the definition of East and West was rather simplified by the existence of the Eastern Bloc. Historians and social scientists generally view the Cold War definition of Western and Eastern Europe as outdated or relegating.

During the final stages of World War II, the future of Europe was decided between the Allies in the 1945 Yalta Conference, between the British Prime Minister, Winston Churchill, the U.S. President, Franklin D. Roosevelt, and the Premier of the Soviet Union, Joseph Stalin.

Post-war Europe would be divided into two major spheres: the Western Bloc, influenced by the United States, and the Eastern Bloc, influenced by the Soviet Union. With the onset of the Cold War, Europe was divided by the Iron Curtain. This term had been used during World War II by German Propaganda Minister Joseph Goebbels and, later, Count Lutz Schwerin von Krosigk in the last days of the war; however, its use was hugely popularized by Winston Churchill, who used it in his famous "Sinews of Peace" address on 5 March 1946 at Westminster College in Fulton, Missouri:

Although some countries were officially neutral, they were classified according to the nature of their political and economic systems. This division largely defines the popular perception and understanding of Western Europe and its borders with Eastern Europe.

The world changed dramatically with the fall of the Iron Curtain in 1989. West Germany peacefully absorbed East Germany, in the German reunification. Comecon and the Warsaw Pact were dissolved, and in 1991, the Soviet Union ceased to exist. Several countries which had been part of the Soviet Union regained full independence.

Western European Union
In 1948 the Treaty of Brussels was signed between Belgium, France, Luxembourg, the Netherlands and the United Kingdom. It was further revisited in 1954 at the Paris Conference, when the Western European Union was established. It was declared defunct in 2011 after the Treaty of Lisbon, and the Treaty of Brussels was terminated. When the Western European Union was dissolved, it had 10 member countries, six associate member countries, five observer countries and seven associate partner countries.

Modern divisions

UN geoscheme classification

The United Nations geoscheme is a system devised by the United Nations Statistics Division (UNSD) which divides the countries of the world into regional and subregional groups, based on the M49 coding classification. The partition is for statistical convenience and does not imply any assumption regarding political or other affiliation of countries or territories.

In the UN geoscheme, the following countries are classified as Western Europe:
 Austria
 Belgium
 France
 Germany
 Liechtenstein
 Luxembourg
 Monaco
 Netherlands
 Switzerland

CIA classification

The CIA classifies seven countries as belonging to "Western Europe":

Belgium
France
Ireland
Luxembourg
Monaco
Netherlands
United Kingdom

The CIA also classifies three countries as belonging to "Southwestern Europe":

Andorra
Portugal
Spain

EuroVoc classification

EuroVoc is a multilingual thesaurus maintained by the Publications Office of the European Union. In this thesaurus, the countries of Europe are grouped into sub-regions. The following countries are included in the sub-group Western Europe:
 Andorra
 Austria
 Belgium
 France
 Germany
 Ireland
 Liechtenstein
 Luxembourg
 Monaco
 Netherlands
 Switzerland
 United Kingdom

UN regional groups: Western European and Others Group

The Western European and Others Group is one of several unofficial Regional Groups in the United Nations that act as voting blocs and negotiation forums. Regional voting blocs were formed in 1961 to encourage voting to various UN bodies from different regional groups. The European members of the group are:

Andorra
Austria
Belgium
Denmark
Finland
France
Germany
Greece
Iceland
Ireland
Italy
Liechtenstein
Luxembourg
Malta
Monaco
Netherlands
Norway
Portugal
San Marino
Spain
Sweden
Switzerland
Turkey
United Kingdom

In addition, Australia, Canada, Israel and New Zealand are members of the group, with the United States as observer.

Population
Using the CIA classification strictly would give the following calculation of Western Europe's population. All figures based on the projections for 2018 by the Population Division of the United Nations Department of Economic and Social Affairs.

Using the CIA classification a little more liberally and including "South-Western Europe", would give the following calculation of Western Europe's population.

Climate

The climate of Western Europe varies from subtropical and semi-arid in the coasts of Italy, Portugal and Spain to alpine in the Pyrenees and the Alps. The Mediterranean climate of the south is dry and warm. The western and northwestern parts have a mild, generally humid climate, influenced by the North Atlantic Current. Western Europe is a heatwave hotspot, exhibiting upward trends that are three-to-four times faster compared to the rest of the northern midlatitudes.

Languages

Western European languages mostly fall within two Indo-European language families: the Romance languages, descended from the Latin of the Roman Empire; and the Germanic languages, whose ancestor language (Proto-Germanic) came from southern Scandinavia.
Romance languages are spoken primarily in the southern and central part of Western Europe, Germanic languages in the northern part (the British Isles and the Low Countries), as well as a large part of Northern and Central Europe.

Other Western European languages include the Celtic group (that is, Irish, Scottish Gaelic, Manx, Welsh, Cornish and Breton) and Basque, the only currently living European language isolate.

Multilingualism and the protection of regional and minority languages are recognized political goals in Western Europe today. The Council of Europe Framework Convention for the Protection of National Minorities and the Council of Europe's European Charter for Regional or Minority Languages set up a legal framework for language rights in Europe.

Economy
Western Europe is one of the richest regions of the world. Germany has the highest gross domestic product in Europe and the largest financial surplus of any country, Luxembourg has the world's highest GDP per capita, and Germany has the highest net national wealth of any European state.

Switzerland and Luxembourg have the highest average wage in the world, in nominal and PPP, respectively. Norway ranks highest in the world on the Social Progress Index.

See also

Central Europe
Eastern Europe
Northern Europe
Southern Europe
Far West
Marshall Plan
Eurovoc#Western Europe
Western world

References

Citations

Sources 

 The Making of Europe, by Robert Bartlett
 Crescent and Cross, by Hugh Bicheno
 The Normans, by Trevor Rowley
 1066: The Year of the Three Battles, by Frank McLynn

External links

The European sub-regions according to the UN
Teaching about Western Europe 

 
Regions of Europe
Articles containing video clips